Jacqueline "Jackie" Burroughs (2 February 1939 – 22 September 2010) was a British-born Canadian actress.

Early life
Born in Southport, Lancashire (now Merseyside), England, she emigrated to Canada on 26 August 1948 with her mother Edna, her father Harry and younger brother Gary.

Career 
Burroughs started acting in live theatre at Ontario's famous Stratford Festival, including starring as Portia in The Merchant of Venice in 1976. Her film credits included The Dead Zone (1983), The Grey Fox (1982), and a voice-over stint in the legendary animated anthology Heavy Metal (1981), while her TV-series resume includes the roles of Mrs. Amelia Evans in Anne of Green Gables (1985) and Hetty King in Road to Avonlea (1990).

In 1987, Jackie Burroughs produced, directed, co-wrote, and starred in A Winter Tan, a film based on the letters of Maryse Holder, published in 1979 as the book Give Sorrow Words – Maryse Holder's Letters from Mexico, later receiving a Genie Award for best performance by an actress in a leading role for the film, and won several more Genies and Geminis during her career.

Her first award was the 1969 Canadian Film Award for best actress, for starring in the television film Dulcima.

In 2001, she was awarded the Earle Grey Award for her contributions to arts and entertainment over the years by the Academy of Canadian Cinema and Television.

In 2005, Burroughs received a Governor General's Performing Arts Award for Lifetime Artistic Achievement, Canada's highest honour in the performing arts.

Burroughs played the voice of The Spirit in 1985's The Care Bears Movie. She also played teacher Nancy Galik in The Undergrads (1985) opposite Art Carney.

She was perhaps best known to American audiences for her portrayal of the fictional character, Hetty King, in the CBC Television series Road to Avonlea from 1990 to 1996. The series was based on the works of Canadian author Lucy Maud Montgomery and produced by Sullivan Entertainment. She also played Mother Mucca in the television adaptations of Armistead Maupin's More Tales of the City and Further Tales of the City. Burroughs again played a mother role in 2003's Willard.

She appeared in the 2006 film The Sentinel. She also appeared in the Smallville season one episode "Hourglass" as the elderly blind prophetess Cassandra Carver.

Personal life
Burroughs was married to Zalman Yanovsky, co-founder (with John Sebastian) of The Lovin' Spoonful; they separated in 1968. They had one daughter, Zoe (a restaurant owner and author in Kingston).

Death
Burroughs died at her home in Toronto on 22 September 2010, aged 71, after suffering from stomach cancer.

Filmography

Film

Television

References

External links 

 (A publication of The Film Reference Library/a division of the Toronto International Film Festival Group)
Images of Jackie Burroughs from the Toronto Telegram fonds at the Clara Thomas Archives and Special Collections, York University 
Jackie Burroughs(aveleyman)

1939 births
2010 deaths
Actresses from Lancashire
Canadian film actresses
Canadian television actresses
Canadian voice actresses
Deaths from cancer in Ontario
Deaths from stomach cancer
English film actresses
English television actresses
English voice actresses
Best Actress in a Drama Series Canadian Screen Award winners
Best Actress Genie and Canadian Screen Award winners
Best Supporting Actress Genie and Canadian Screen Award winners
Governor General's Performing Arts Award winners
English emigrants to Canada
Canadian Shakespearean actresses
Best Supporting Actress in a Television Film or Miniseries Canadian Screen Award winners